Michael Schlicht (born 13 November 1993) is a German footballer who plays as a midfielder for FC Eilenburg.

References

External links
 

German footballers
Association football midfielders
1993 births
Living people
FC Sachsen Leipzig players
RB Leipzig players
RB Leipzig II players
FSV Zwickau players
1. FC Schweinfurt 05 players
FSV Budissa Bautzen players
VfB Auerbach players
1. FC Lokomotive Leipzig players
3. Liga players
Regionalliga players
Oberliga (football) players
Footballers from Leipzig